The enzyme orsellinate-depside hydrolase (EC 3.1.1.40) catalyzes the reaction

orsellinate depside + H2O  2 orsellinate

This enzyme belongs to the family of hydrolases, specifically those acting on carboxylic ester bonds.  The systematic name is orsellinate-depside hydrolase. This enzyme is also called lecanorate hydrolase.

References

 

EC 3.1.1
Enzymes of unknown structure